The  is the first comprehensive dictionary of Turkic languages, compiled in 1072–74 by the Turkic scholar Mahmud Kashgari who extensively studied the Turkic languages of his time.

Importance
Dīwān Lughāt al-Turk was intended for use by the Caliphs of Baghdad, who were controlled by the Seljuk Turks. It has a map that shows countries and regions from Japan to Egypt. The book also included the first known map of the areas inhabited by Turkic peoples.

The compendium documented evidence of Turkic migration and the expansion of the Turkic tribes and Turkic languages into Central Asia, Eastern Europe and West Asia, mainly between the 6th and 11th centuries. The region of origin of the Turkic people is suggested to be somewhere in Siberia and Mongolia. By the 10th century most of Central Asia was settled by Turkic tribes such as Tatar, Kipchaks, Türkmen, etc. The Seljuq dynasty settled in Anatolia starting in the 11th century, ultimately resulting in permanent Turkic settlement and presence there. Meanwhile, other Turkic tribes either ultimately formed independent nations, such as Kyrgyzstan, Turkmenistan, Uzbekistan and Kazakhstan, and others new enclaves within other nations, such as Chuvashia, Bashkortostan, Tatarstan, the Crimean Tatars, the Uyghurs in China, and the Sakha Republic in Siberia.

Content
Mahmud al-Kashgari's comprehensive dictionary, later edited by the Turkish historian, Ali Amiri, contains specimens of old Turkic poetry in the typical form of quatrains of Persian literature (Persian  ruba'i), representing all the principal genres: epic, pastoral, didactic, lyric, and elegiac.

Location
It has been previously housed at the National Library in Istanbul, but as of February 2020 is in display at the Presidential Library in Ankara.

References

External links
 
ar.wikisource.org
كتاب ديوان لغات الترك

1070s books
11th-century Arabic books
Turkic grammars
Turkic languages
Turkic literature

11th-century Turkish books
Turkish books
Turkish dictionaries
Geographical works of the medieval Islamic world